Squirrel Flower is the stage name of American musician Ella Williams.

Early life
Williams grew up in Arlington, Massachusetts. When Williams was a child, she gave herself the nickname Squirrel Flower. In 2014, she moved to Iowa.

History
After getting involved in the DIY scene in Boston as a teenager, Williams moved to Iowa. There, she wrote her first EP as Squirrel Flower and began setting up small tours for herself. This first EP, titled Early Winter Songs From Middle America, was self-released in 2015.

In 2016, Williams released her second EP titled Contact Sports on a St. Louis-based DIY tape label called It Takes Time.

Williams' debut album, I Was Born Swimming, was released in 2020 via Polyvinyl Records. The album was produced by Gabe Wax. This anticipated label debut earned overwhelming praise from the likes of Gorilla vs. Bear, NPR Music, and Paste, and she was named Rolling Stone Artist You Need To Know, Stereogum's Artist to Watch, The FADER's Gen F, and The Guardian's One to Watch. In May 2020, Squirrel Flower released the single "Take It Or Leave It", backed with her cover of Caroline Polachek's "So Hot You’re Hurting My Feelings."

Discography
Studio albums
Contact Sports (Deluxe Edition) (2018, 2000 Pigs)
I Was Born Swimming (2020, Polyvinyl)
Planet (i) (2021, Polyvinyl)

EPs
Early Winter Songs from Middle America (2015, self-released)
Contact Sports (2016, It Takes Time. Re-released on vinyl in 2018 by 2000 Pigs)
Planet (2022, Full Time Hobby)

Singles
"Midwestern Clay" (2016)
"Not Your Prey" (2016)
"Red Shoulder" (2019)
"Headlights" (2019)
"Streetlight Blues" (2020)
"Take It or Leave It / So Hot You’re Hurting My Feelings" (2020)
"Explain It to Me / Chicago" (2020)
"Hurt a Fly" (2021)
"I'll Go Running" (2021)
”Flames and Flat Tires” (2021)

References

1996 births
Living people
People from Arlington, Massachusetts
American indie rock musicians
Musicians from Massachusetts
Indie folk musicians
Polyvinyl Record Co. artists
American folk singers
21st-century American women guitarists
21st-century American guitarists